The Tel Aviv Lightning was an Israeli baseball team from Tel Aviv in the Israel Baseball League.

The Lightning finished the inaugural 2007 season in second place with a 26-14 (.650) record, and lost to the Modi'in Miracle in the semifinals of the 2007 IBL championship.

6' 5" lefthander Aaron Pribble was 7-2, with a league-leading  1.94 ERA.  Daniel Kaufman, who pitched for Emory University, held opposing batters to a .170 batting average.  The Most Valuable Israeli Player was pitcher Dan Rothem.

History

On February 26, 2007 it was announced that former Major League Baseball player Steve Hertz would be the manager of the Express.

The first player selected by the Lightning in the inaugural draft was Dominican catcher Anderson Mejia.

Stadium
Located at the Sportek Baseball Field in Tel Aviv.

2007 roster

Footnotes

External links
Official
  Official site of the Tel Aviv Lightning

Unofficial
   Tel Aviv Lightning Fan Site

Baseball teams in Israel